Ninaivil Nindraval is a Tamil-language film directed by director Agasthiya Bharathi and produced by Sree Sabari Movies. The film features Ashwin Sekhar, Keerthi Chawla and Gayathri Venkatagiri in the lead roles, while D. Imman composes the film's music. The film, which began in 2008, went through significant production delays before releasing on 31 January 2014.

Cast
Ashwin Shekhar as Ramana
Keerthi Chawla
Gayathri
S. Ve. Sekhar
Thalaivasal Vijay
Ilavarasan
Kadhal Sukumar
Vaiyapuri
Chinni Jayanth
M. S. Bhaskar
Sona Heiden
Manobala

Production
Production on the film began in April 2008, with Ashwin Sekhar appearing in his second film. The film, which was also announced to feature Keerthi Chawla and Gayathri in lead roles, was to be directed by newcomer Agasthiya Bharathi. The film was initially reported to be scheduled for a release date in September 2008, though delays meant the deadline was not met.

The audio and trailer of the film were released  in July 2011 in an event attended by Union Minister of Shipping, G. K. Vasan and the first copy was received by G. Asokan, publisher of pocket novels, along with members of the film unit. However the film was further delayed and remained unreleased. The director of the film, Agasthya Bharathi died in 2012 before the film released.

The film was screened in January 2014 for the film industry, with S. Ve. Sekhar taking up the duty to release the film. The film was also briefly called Ninaivil Niraivil as the team geared up for release, but was eventually released under the original title.

Release
The film was released on 31 January 2014.  The reviewer from The New Indian Express stated "the director has confined the narration to less than two hours and touched on an issue rarely handled on screen by taking a nice stand on it is appreciable."

Soundtrack
The songs for the film were composed by D. Imman and lyrics written by Vaali, and were released in July 2011. The soundtrack contained remix version of "Nila Adhu" from Nayagan (1987).

References

2010s Tamil-language films
2014 films
Films about social issues in India
2014 directorial debut films
Films scored by D. Imman